DXYS (105.1 FM), broadcasting as 105.1 Easy Rock, is a radio station owned and operated by Manila Broadcasting Company through its licensee Cebu Broadcasting Company. The station's studio is located at the Ground Floor, ATU Plaza Commercial Mall, Governor Duterte St., Davao City, and its transmitter is located along Broadcast Ave., Shrine Hills, Matina, Davao City.

History
The station was inaugurated in 1995 as a relay station of Manila-based Showbiz Tsismis. In 1999, it rebranded as Yes FM and adopted a mass-based format. On July 1, 2009, the station rebranded as 105.1 Easy Rock and switched to a Soft AC format.

References

Radio stations in Davao City
Adult contemporary radio stations in the Philippines
Radio stations established in 1995
Easy Rock Network stations